Singapore Township is an integrated township located in Pocharam Municipality, Hyderabad, Telangana, India. Actual name of this township is Sanskruti Township. It is a joint venture between Andhra Pradesh Housing Board (APHB), now known as Telangana Housing Board and Singapore government body. The IT major, Infosys and Genpact has their campus close to the township.

Singapore Township has recorded the highest rainfall ever in Telangana about 32.3 cm within 24 hours during the monsoon of the year 2020.

It was planned to have 1600 apartments at the launch of the project. Currently it has total 2080 apartments. Categorised as
 1216 3-BHK
 704 2-BHK
 120 Duplex
 40 Penthouse apartment

Website: www.sanskrutitownship.in, www.SingaporeTownship.in

References

Villages in Ranga Reddy district
Townships in India